Tachyusida is a genus of beetles belonging to the family Staphylinidae.

The species of this genus are found in Europe.

Species:
 Tachyusida gracilis (Erichson, 1837) 
 Tachyusida luteipennis (Fenyes, 1914)

References

Staphylinidae
Staphylinidae genera